The 3rd TCA Awards were presented by the Television Critics Association. The ceremony was held on July 28, 1987.

Winners

Multiple wins 
The following shows received multiple wins:

References

External links
 Official website
 1987 TCA Awards at IMDb.com

1987 television awards
1987 in American television
TCA Awards ceremonies